Luis Anibal Montañez (born December 15, 1981) is a Puerto Rican former professional baseball outfielder. He played in Major League Baseball (MLB) for the Baltimore Orioles and Chicago Cubs.

Professional career

Minor leagues
Montañez was drafted by the Chicago Cubs with the third overall pick of the 2000 MLB draft. He spent seven seasons in the Cubs' farm system but never made it to the major leagues.

On January 5, 2007, Montañez signed a minor league contract with the Baltimore Orioles. After batting .335 with 26 home runs and 97 RBI in 116 games for the Orioles Double-A affiliate Bowie Baysox, he was called up to the majors for the first time. In 2008, Montañez won the Eastern League Triple Crown despite missing nearly a month of the season after getting called up to the majors.

Baltimore Orioles
Montañez made his major league debut on August 5, 2008, playing an inning defensively and without making a plate appearance. The next day, he hit a home run in his first major-league at bat, making him the second Oriole to accomplish the feat, the first having been Buster Narum in 1963. After starting the 2009 season playing for the Orioles Triple-A affiliate, Norfolk Tides, Montañez was recalled to the majors on April 21 after an injury to Ryan Freel. On November 10, 2010, Montanez became a minor league free agent.

Chicago Cubs
Montañez signed a minor league deal with the Chicago Cubs on January 12, 2011. He was called up from the Iowa Cubs on May 24, 2011 and was in the lineup that night at Wrigley Field against the New York Mets. His first at-bat resulted in an RBI double. He elected free agency on November 28.

Late career
Montañez was signed to a minor league contract by the Philadelphia Phillies on December 21, 2011. He also received an invitation to spring training. He began the year with Triple-A Lehigh Valley. On May 4, Montañez was released. On May 21, Montañez signed a minor league deal with the St. Louis Cardinals and was assigned to Triple-A Memphis. In 101 total games that year, Montañez hit .241 with two home runs and 26 RBI in 359 plate appearances.

On April 3, 2013, Montañez signed with the Somerset Patriots of the Atlantic League. In 52 games with the club, he hit .313 with six home runs and 41 RBI. On June 20, Montañez signed a minor league deal with the Los Angeles Angels of Anaheim. He was assigned to Double-A Arkansas.

On April 25, 2014, Montañez again signed with the Somerset Patriots. He became a free agent after the season.

See also
List of players with a home run in first major league at-bat

Notes

References

External links

1981 births
Living people
Major League Baseball outfielders
Major League Baseball players from Puerto Rico
Arizona League Cubs players
Lansing Lugnuts players
Daytona Cubs players
Boise Hawks players
Peoria Chiefs players
West Tennessee Diamond Jaxx players
Iowa Cubs players
Bowie Baysox players
Norfolk Tides players
Gulf Coast Orioles players
Frederick Keys players
Baltimore Orioles players
Chicago Cubs players
Sportspeople from Bayamón, Puerto Rico
Lehigh Valley IronPigs players
Memphis Redbirds players
Somerset Patriots players
Arkansas Travelers players